KTAL-FM (98.1 MHz, "98 Rocks") is a classic rock music radio station licensed to Texarkana, Texas, with studios in Shreveport, Louisiana. It is owned by Alpha Media LLC, through licensee Alpha Media Licensee LLC Debtor in Possession.  Its studios are located just north of downtown Shreveport, and the transmitter is in Vivian, Louisiana.

The station is a former sister station of KCMC and KTAL-TV, all of which were owned for many years by WEHCO Media until the company sold its broadcasting assets.

On-air personalities

 Tom Michaels 
 Greg The Nukeman Hanson
 Bobby Cook 
 Gary Newell 
 Lonnie Haskins

External links
Official Website

TAL-FM
Classic rock radio stations in the United States
Radio stations established in 1945
Alpha Media radio stations
1945 establishments in Texas